Big Mess is the second solo studio album by American singer, musician, and composer Danny Elfman. It was released by Anti- and Epitaph Records on June 11, 2021.

The album is Elfman's first studio album outside of his film and classical compositions since the 1994 album Boingo with his former band Oingo Boingo, and his first solo pop release since the 1984 album So-Lo. Although Big Mess features former members of Oingo Boingo, such as Steve Bartek, Warren Fitzgerald, and Marc Mann, it is not an Oingo Boingo collaboration in the vein of So-Lo.

Elfman had initially written two songs, "Sorry" and "Happy"—his first non-commissioned songs since Oingo Boingo disbanded—that were intended to debut at the Coachella Valley Music and Arts Festival in 2020. The show was also planned to feature a number of reworked versions of Elfman's film score compositions and Oingo Boingo songs, but was cancelled due to the COVID-19 pandemic. A complete album was then written, unplanned, with Elfman stating that once he started, he "couldn't stop", ultimately recording a total of 18 songs. The album was teased with a series of singles, beginning with "Happy" in October 2020, and continuing on from January 2021, with releases on the 11th date of each month.

The album comprises two "heavily contrasting" halves and ends with a new version of the Oingo Boingo song "Insects", from the 1982 album Nothing to Fear. 

In December 2021, Anti- and Epitaph Records announced an upcoming deluxe box set which includes four colored vinyl LPs, a 60-page artbook, a life-sized hand of Elfman's as a lamp and a signed poster. Two of the records contain remixes and vocals from musicians such as Trent Reznor, Blixa Bargeld, Rebekah del Rio, Fever333, HEALTH, Squarepusher and Machine Girl. These remixes would, over time, be made more widely available with the release of the remix album Bigger. Messier. and its "Deluxe" edition in 2022. The "Big Mess" box set was nominated for a Grammy 2023 in the category "Best Boxed or Limited Edition Box Set" (Art Director Berit Gilma).

Track listing 

All songs written by Danny Elfman.

Disc one

Disc two

Personnel 

Musicians
 Danny Elfman – vocals, guitar and synthesizers
 Josh Freese – drums
 Stu Brooks – bass guitar
 Robin Finck – guitar
 Nili Brosh – guitar
 Warren Fitzgerald – guitar
 Sidney Hopson – percussion
 Joe Martone – percussion

Additional musicians
 Petra Haden – female vocal solo
 Holly Sedillos – female chorister
 Anna Schubert – female chorister
 Danielle Withers – female chorister
 Lyris Quartet – strings
 Budapest Art Orchestra – orchestra
 Budapest Scoring Orchestra – orchestra ("Happy" and "Sorry")

Technical
 Danny Elfman – producer
 Steve Bartek – string orchestration
 Marc Mann – orchestration assistant
 Noah Snyder – engineer, mixing
 Zakk Cervini – mixing
 Joel Hamilton – mixing
 Pete Rutcho – mixing
 Randall Dunn – mixing
 Nik Trekov – mixing assistant
 Francisco Botero – mixing assistant
 Ben Greenberg – mixing assistant
 Garrett de Block – mixing assistant
 Nick Rives – additional engineering
 Matt Tuggle – additional engineering
 Joe LaPorta – mastering
 Berit Gwendolyn Gilma – creative/art director

Bigger. Messier. 

Both before and after the release of the album, remixes of most of its singles, as well as "We Belong" would be released as promotional standalone singles. Ahead of the release of the album, on April 1, a remix of "Kick Me" by Zach Hill, drummer of experimental rap group Death Grips, was released. After the release, five more remixes were released as singles:

 "True", featuring Trent Reznor of Nine Inch Nails, released on August 11
 "We Belong", remixed by Squarepusher, released on September 10
 "Serious Ground", remixed by Xiu Xiu, released on October 12
 "Sorry", remixed by Kid606, released on November 30
 "Native Intelligence", also featuring Reznor, released on March 21, 2022

On December 8, these remixes, alongside others, were announced to feature in a deluxe box set of the album. A standalone release was not announced at this time.

On June 29, 2022, the remix album Bigger. Messier. was announced for release on August 12. The album would feature most of the remixes contained in the "Deluxe" box set, alongside new ones. In promotion of the announcement, a new remix of "Kick Me" featuring a spoken-word performance by Iggy Pop was released. The album was later expanded with a deluxe edition (stylized as Bigger. Messier. This edition would add the remixes previously exclusive to the "Deluxe" box set of the original album, alongside one new track, a remix of "Sorry" by Ghostemane. The outreaches for the remixes were curated by bassist Stu Brooks and Elfmans's Creative Director Berit Gilma.

Track listing

References 

2021 albums
Danny Elfman albums
Anti- (record label) albums
Albums impacted by the COVID-19 pandemic